Elisabetta Pozzi (born  23 February 1955) is an Italian film, television and stage actress.

Life and career 
Born in Genoa, Pozzi started to study acting during her high school years at the drama school of her hometown, and she made her debut on stage at seventeen years old, playing the role of Romilda in an adaptation of Luigi Pirandello's The Late Mattia Pascal directed by Giorgio Albertazzi. Pozzi soon asserted herself as one of the most requested actresses of Italian theatre, notably working with Luca Ronconi, Peter Stein, Luigi Squarzina, Nanni Loy, Giancarlo Cobelli and at the Piccolo Teatro in Milan. She is also active on television, in which she played main roles on several TV-series, and in films, where she is best known for the role of Adriana in Carlo Verdone's Maledetto il giorno che t'ho incontrato, a role that gave her a David di Donatello for Best Supporting Actress.

References

External links 
 

Italian film actresses
Italian television actresses
Italian stage actresses
1955 births
Actors from Genoa
Living people
David di Donatello winners